Maggie Shipstead is an American novelist, short story author, essayist, and travel writer. She is the author of Seating Arrangements (2012)  Astonish Me (2014), Great Circle (2021), and the short story collection You Have a Friend in 10A (2022). She grew up in Mission Viejo, California, and currently resides in Los Angeles, California.

After attending Harvard University and earning an MFA at Iowa Writers' Workshop, she was awarded a Stegner Fellowship. After finishing the Stegner fellowship, she published her first novel, Seating Arrangements, in 2012. It describes a wedding weekend on a monied, fictional New England island, and received critical acclaim. The New York Times described it as a "smart and frothy debut novel," and it received the Los Angeles Times Book Prize for First Fiction and the Dylan Thomas Prize.

Her second novel, Astonish Me (2014), spans three decades of intrigue and romance in the ballet world starting in 1977. It received mixed reviews, with the New York Times describing the prose as "unexceptional, subservient to the momentum of Shipstead’s schematic plot." However, The Guardian praised it for "nimble writing barely misses a beat, any plot implausibility amply compensated for by her serious addressing of a devotion to artistic endeavour that crosses generations and captivates opposing individuals."

In 2021, she published her third novel, Great Circle, to wide acclaim. The Washington Post described it as a "a soaring work of historical fiction about a “lady pilot” in the mid-20th century." It was shortlisted for the 2021 Booker Prize and for the 2022 Women's Prize for Fiction. It portrays a fearless female aviator, Marian Graves, who struggles to break through the sexist norms of aviation from the 1910s-1950s, while framing the story through the eyes of an actress who is portraying Graves on screen in present day. It was optioned by Picturestart in the summer of 2021 for development into a television show, with Shipstead serving as an executive producer.

In 2022, Shipstead published  the short story collection You Have a Friend in 10A . Many of the short stories had been previously published in journals such as Tin House and Virginia Quarterly Review in the decade leading up to the publication of Great Circle. While many of the ten stories were praised, some reviewers criticized the book for being inconsistent: while the New York praised the writing of "La Moretta" as a standout, it noted that other stories seemed "plainly unfinished."

Shipstead also spends much of her time traveling the world and is a celebrated essayist and travel writer. She has written for magazines and newspapers including Condé Nast Traveler, The New York Times and Departures.

Bibliography

References

External links
Interview with Shipstead in the San Diego Union-Tribune

Living people
Writers from California
21st-century American novelists
American women novelists
Harvard University alumni
Iowa Writers' Workshop alumni
21st-century American women writers
1983 births